Escape from Planet Monday is a drum and bass album by former Bad Company member DJ Fresh. The album was released in 2006 to positive reviews.

The album has several adjoining tracks such as the intro tracks and "The Looking Glass".

Track listing

External links

2006 debut albums
DJ Fresh albums